Syed Abdullah Muhammad Taher  (born 1958) is a Bangladeshi politician and former Member of Parliament for the Comilla-12 constituency in seventh parliamentary elections from 2001 to 2006 in Bangladesh. He is a Central Working Committee member of Bangladesh Jamaat-e-Islami, and its International Affairs secretary.

Career 
Later, he was selected as Secretary General of the Islami Chatra Shibir and finally led the organisation as its Central President for two consecutive terms during 1985-86 and 1986–87.

Member of Parliament

He was elected as a Member of Parliament in Bangladesh from 2001 to 2006 and was part of two parliamentary bodies, the Public accounts committee and the Public undertaking committee.

Imprisonment

Taher was imprisoned several times, most recently in 2013, when he was arrested on 2 January 2013, by RAB personnel, in connection with various allegations, including arson attacks, attacks on police and conspiracy against the government. He was later released on bail.

He was also arrested by joint forces on allegations of extortion, looting and grabbing during the tenure of the military backed caretaker government on 7 March 2007. He was released on ad-interim bail on 7 August 2008.

References

Bangladesh Jamaat-e-Islami politicians
1958 births
Living people
Dhaka Medical College alumni
8th Jatiya Sangsad members
Bangladeshi people of Arab descent
20th-century Bengalis
21st-century Bengalis